László Varjas (born 17 May 2000 in Székesfehérvár) is a Hungarian football player who currently plays for Vác FC on loan from Mezőkövesdi SE.

Career

Mezőkövesd
On 15 December 2018, Varjas played his first match for Mzeőkövesd in a 0-2 loss against Puskás Akadémia FC in the Hungarian League. On 14 February 2019, Varjas was loaned out to Vác FC for the rest of the season.

Club statistics

Updated to games played as of 2 November 2019.

References

External links

2000 births
Living people
Sportspeople from Székesfehérvár
Hungarian footballers
Association football forwards
Mezőkövesdi SE footballers
Vác FC players
Nemzeti Bajnokság I players
Nemzeti Bajnokság II players